Doge Weather (or dogeweather.com) is a weather forecasting mobile app, web application, and website incorporating the Internet meme Doge.

Function 
Doge Weather reports temperature and weather conditions based on the user's geographic location. The mobile app allows the user to toggle between the Celsius and Fahrenheit temperature scales. Doge also describes the weather conditions with "omg brisk," "so clouds," and "such cold."

History 
In January 2014, Sydney-based web developers Katia Eirin and Bennett Wong created Doge Weather. It was inspired by the similar website Drake Weather which features the profile of Canadian rapper Drake superimposed on the album cover art Nothing Was the Same. Its creators request Dogecoins to maintain the website. In April 2014, Doge Weather became available as a mobile app for iOS 7 costing 99¢.

Reception 
Many publications reviewed the app positively. Australian popular culture and news website Junkee said "Doge Weather is here for you, translating the weather in your current geo location into your favourite language." MTVs Deepa Lakshmin ranked Doge Weather at #6 on "These 15 Essential (And Free) Websites Will Help You Survive College," with "We're sick of the Internet's obsession with Doge too, but we're kind of obligated to include this site on the list." Macgasms Michael McConnell said "What it lacks in radar and extended forecasts it makes up for in simply being hilarious."

Macgasms Nick Mediati critiqued that "You can tell that whoever made Doge Weather doesn't live in a snowy part of the world since the app considers temperatures in the low 50s as 'cold.' How very… Californian" and also "lacks a bunch of features that you'll find in more traditional weather apps. You won't find an extended forecast here, and you can't add multiple locations. Such bummer. Many sad." The New York Observers Billy Richling said it "updates us with phrases like 'much brrr' and 'such icy.'" International Business Timess Mary-Ann Russon remarked "The internet's current favourite meme Doge is now so popular that he's now got his own website doling out weather reports."

The Washington Examiners Ashe Schow compared the app as an alternative to  weather.com with "So, unhappy with the typical weather choices, you want something new, something that speaks to your particular brand of the nonsensical humor." Slates Forrest Wickman reviewed the website with "your sunny days are just a little bit brighter." Wickman also asked Georgia-based Slate writer Holly Allen to use the app to document the Mid-February 2014 North American winter storm. Dogsters Susan C. Willett reviewed four apps with the same theme with "Translate current local weather into Dogespeak, which wanders across the screen. Very weather."

References

External links
 

2010s fads and trends
Android (operating system) software
Animals on the Internet
Computer-related introductions in 2014
Dogs in popular culture
Internet memes introduced in 2014
IOS software
Meteorological data and networks
Mobile software